Az élet királya is a 1918 Hungarian film directed by Alfréd Deésy. It is an adaptation of The Picture of Dorian Gray by Oscar Wilde.

The film premiered in Budapest January 21, 1918 and was described as an "almost unprecedented success" in local Budapest press. It received a positive review in Pesti Napló.

Plot summary

Cast
Cast adapted from the books Lugosi : His Life in Films, on Stage, and in the Hearts of Horror Lovers and Becoming Dracula: Volume 1.

Production
Az élet királya was based on Oscar Wilde's novel The Picture of Dorian Gray (1891). In the film, Norbert Dán plays Dorian Gray while Bela Lugosi portrayed Lord Harry Watton, known in the novel as Lord Henry Wotton.

Release
Az élet királya was previewed at the Uránia in Budapest on October 23, 1917. It was officially released in January 21, 1918 at Budapest's Corso Theater. The film was described as an "almost unprecedented success" in local Budapest press.

In some ads, the film was referred to as simple Élet királya. The film was released in Germany as Die Spur seiner Sünden. Outside of Hungary it was also known as Dorian Gray Arckepe. As of 2022, as with nearly all of Lugosi's Hungarian film productions, no copy of the film is known to exist.

Reception
In the Hungarian newspaper Pesti Napló, a critic declared the film "a great psychological drama" and declared it an interesting comparison with the German film Das Bildnis des Dorian Gray by Richard Oswald. Other reviews praised the work of Bela Lugosi, who performed in the film under the name Arisztid Olt. A critic in Mozihét Kino-Woche stated Lugis played Lord Watton "with an artfulness of the highest quality" while another called his acting "most noble."

See also
 Bela Lugosi filmography
 Adaptations of The Picture of Dorian Gray

References

Sources

External links
 

1918 films
1918 drama films
Hungarian black-and-white films
Hungarian silent feature films
Hungarian drama films
Films directed by Alfréd Deésy
Films based on The Picture of Dorian Gray
Silent drama films
Lost Hungarian films
1918 lost films
Lost drama films